The Power of Silence is a 1912 silent film drama short directed by and starring Romaine Fielding, with Mary Ryan and Robyn Adair. It was produced by the Lubin Manufacturing Company.

Cast
Romaine Fielding - Thomas Lowry, a Ranch owner or The Silent One
Mary Ryan - Jane, Lowry's Daughter
Robyn Adair - Robert Sinclair, Lowry's Nephew
Richard Wangermann - (*billed Richard Wangemann)
Henry Aldrich - (*billed Henry Alrich)
George Clancey - (*billed George Clancy)
Edgar Jones - unknown role
Clara Williams - unknown role

References

External links
 The Power of Silence at IMDb.com

1912 films
American silent short films
1912 short films
Films directed by Romaine Fielding
Lubin Manufacturing Company films
American black-and-white films
1912 drama films
Silent American drama films
1910s American films